Mac OS X Jaguar (version 10.2) is the third major release of macOS, Apple's desktop and server operating system. It superseded Mac OS X 10.1 and preceded Mac OS X Panther. The operating system was released on August 23, 2002 either for single-computer installations, and in a "family pack," which allowed five installations on separate computers in one household. Jaguar was the first Mac OS X release to publicly use its code name in marketing and advertisements.

System requirements
Mac OS X Jaguar required a PowerPC G3 or G4 CPU and 128 MB of RAM.  Special builds were released for the first PowerPC G5 systems released by Apple.

New and changed features
Jaguar introduced many new features to Mac OS X, which are still supported to this day, including MPEG-4 support in QuickTime, Address Book, and Inkwell for handwriting recognition.  It also included the first release of Apple's Zeroconf implementation, Rendezvous (later renamed to Bonjour), which allows devices on the same network to automatically discover each other and offer available services, such as file sharing, shared scanners, and printers, to the user.

Mac OS X Jaguar Server 10.2.2 added journaling to HFS Plus, the native Macintosh file system, to add increased reliability and data recovery features.  This was later added to the standard Mac OS X in version 10.3 Panther.

Jaguar saw the debut of Quartz Extreme, a technology used to composite graphics directly on the video card, without the use of software to composite windows. The technology allotted the task of drawing the 3D surface of windows to the video card, rather than to the CPU, to increase interface responsiveness and performance.

Universal Access was added to allow the Macintosh to be usable by disabled computer users.

The user interface of Jaguar was also amended to add search features to the Finder using the updated Sherlock 3.

Internally, Jaguar also added the Common Unix Printing System (also known as CUPS), a modular printing system for Unix-like operating systems, and improved support for Microsoft Windows networks using the open-source Samba as a server for the SMB remote file access protocol and a FreeBSD-derived virtual file system module as a client for SMB.

The famous Happy Mac that had greeted Mac users for almost 18 years during the Macintosh startup sequence was replaced with a large grey Apple logo with the introduction of Mac OS X Jaguar.

Marketing
Unlike Mac OS X 10.1, Jaguar was a paid upgrade, costing $129. In October 2002, Apple offered free copies of Jaguar to all U.S K-12 teachers as part of the "X For Teachers" program. Teachers who wanted to get a copy simply had to fill out a form and a packet containing Mac OS X installation discs and manuals was shipped to the school where they worked.

Jaguar marked the first Mac OS X release which publicly used its code name as both a marketing ploy and as an official reference to the operating system. To that effect, Apple replaced the packaging for Mac OS X with a new jaguar-themed box, with computer-generated jaguar fur designed by animation studio Pixar.

Starting with Jaguar, Mac OS X releases were given a feline-related marketing name upon announcement until the introduction of OS X Mavericks in June 2013, at which point releases began to be named after locations in California, where Apple is headquartered. Mac OS X (rebranded as OS X in 2012 and later macOS in 2016) releases are now also referred to by their marketing name, in addition to version numbers.

Release history

Mac OS X 10.2.7 (codenames Blackrider, Smeagol) was only available to the new Power Mac G5s and aluminum PowerBook G4s released before Mac OS X Panther. Officially, it was never released to the general public.

Mac OS X 10.2.8 is the last version of Mac OS X officially supported on the "Beige G3" desktop, minitower, and all-in-one systems as well as the PowerBook G3 Series (1998) also known as Wallstreet/PDQ; though later releases can be run on such Macs with the help of unofficial, unlicensed, and unsupported third-party tools such as XPostFacto.

Timeline

References

External links
Mac OS X v10.2 review at Ars Technica
 from apple.com

	

2
PowerPC operating systems
2002 software
Computer-related introductions in 2002